The Men's Giant Slalom in the 2021 FIS Alpine Skiing World Cup involved ten events, as scheduled. 

Defending discipline champion Henrik Kristoffersen of Norway never seriously threatened to retain his title.  Instead, the season-long race for the crystal globe turned into a two-man battle between 2020 runner-up Alexis Pinturault of France (who lost the previous year by six points after the last two giant slaloms of the year were canceled) and rising Swiss skier Marco Odermatt -- who were also battling each other for the overall championship.  After Odermatt won the next-to-last race in Kranjska Gora, Slovenia, while Pintaurault finished fourth, Odermatt passed Pinturault and took a 25-point lead in the discipline with just the finals in Lenzerheide, Switzerland (where Odermatt would have a home advantage) remaining. 

However, Pinturault himself then came from behind, winning the finals in Lenzerheide to pass Odermatt for the season championship in this discipline (and also to clinch the overall championship). This was Pinturault's first season title in giant slalom, becoming the first French champion in the discipline since 2002.

The season was interrupted by the 2021 World Ski Championships, which were held from 8–21 February in Cortina d'Ampezzo, Italy.  The men's giant slalom was held on 19 February 2021.

Standings 

DNS = Did Not Start
DNF1 = Did Not Finish run 1
DNQ2 = Did Not Qualify for run 2
DNF2 = Did Not Finish run 2

Updated at 20 March 2021 after all events.

See also
 2021 Alpine Skiing World Cup – Men's summary rankings
 2021 Alpine Skiing World Cup – Men's Overall
 2021 Alpine Skiing World Cup – Men's Downhill
 2021 Alpine Skiing World Cup – Men's Super-G
 2021 Alpine Skiing World Cup – Men's Slalom
 2021 Alpine Skiing World Cup – Men's Parallel
 World Cup scoring system

References

External links
 Alpine Skiing at FIS website

Men's Giant Slalom
FIS Alpine Ski World Cup men's giant slalom discipline titles